The Other Person is a 1921 Dutch-British silent mystery film directed by Maurits Binger and B.E. Doxat-Pratt. It was a co-production between a Dutch film company and a British film company.

The film was based on a 1920 mystery novel called The Other Person which was written by Fergus Hume, the prolific author of crime fiction, thrillers and mysteries. Lead actress Zoe Palmer went on to star in Sweeney Todd (1928).

Plot
The film is about a spiritualist whose darkest secret is revealed during a seance, a scene that critic Troy Howarth said was strikingly similar to a scene in Dario Argento's 1974 film Deep Red, in which a murderer is unmasked during a seance.

Cast
 Zoe Palmer - Alice Dene
 Adelqui Migliar - Andrew Grain
 Arthur Pusey - Chris Larcher
 E. Story Gofton - Dr. Press
 Willem Hunsche - Amos Larcher
 Ivo Dawson - Squire Grain
 Nora Hayden - Dolly Banks
 Arthur Walcott - Reverend Augustus Dene
 Annie Busquet - Mevr. Larcher
 Johan de Boer
 Frans Meermans

References

External links 
 

1921 films
Dutch silent feature films
Dutch black-and-white films
1921 mystery films
Films directed by Maurits Binger
Silent mystery films